Verasper is a genus of righteye flounders native to the northwestern Pacific Ocean.

Species
There are currently two recognized species in this genus:
 Verasper moseri Jordan & Gilbert, 1898 (Barfin flounder)
 Verasper variegatus (Temminck & Schlegel, 1846) (Spotted halibut)

References 

 
Pleuronectidae
Marine fish genera
 
Taxa named by David Starr Jordan
Taxa named by Charles Henry Gilbert